Derwin Devon Gray (born May 10, 1995) is an American football offensive tackle for the Birmingham Stallions of the United States Football League (USFL). He played college football at Maryland.

Professional career

Pittsburgh Steelers
Gray was drafted by the Pittsburgh Steelers in the seventh round, 219th overall, of the 2019 NFL Draft. He was waived on August 31, 2019, and was signed to the practice squad the next day. On December 30, he was signed by the Steelers to a reserve/future contract.

On September 5, 2020, Gray was waived by the Steelers and was signed to the practice squad the next day. He was promoted to the active roster on September 18, 2020. He was waived on December 26, 2020.

Jacksonville Jaguars
On December 28, 2020, Gray was claimed off waivers by the Jacksonville Jaguars. He signed a one-year exclusive-rights free agent tender with the Jaguars on March 26, 2021. He was waived on August 24, 2021.

Tennessee Titans
On August 25, 2021, Gray was claimed off waivers by the Tennessee Titans. He was waived on August 31, 2021 and re-signed to the practice squad. He was released on September 7. He was re-signed to the practice squad on October 12. After the Titans were eliminated in the Divisional Round of the 2021 playoffs, he signed a reserve/future contract on January 24, 2022. He was waived on June 6, 2022.

Birmingham Stallions
Gray signed with the Birmingham Stallions of the USFL on December 21, 2022.

References

External links
Maryland Terrapins football bio

1995 births
Living people
Players of American football from Washington, D.C.
American football offensive linemen
Maryland Terrapins football players
Pittsburgh Steelers players
Jacksonville Jaguars players
Tennessee Titans players
Birmingham Stallions (2022) players